The 2004 Kremlin Cup - Men's Singles was a male tennis tournament which took place at the Olympic Stadium in Moscow. Taylor Dent did not return to defend his title from the 2003 Cup. Nikolay Davydenko won in the final 3–6, 6–3, 7–5 against Greg Rusedski. It was Davydenko's 2nd title of the year and 4th title overall.

Seeds

Draw

Finals

Top half

Bottom half

External links
 2004 Kremlin Cup Draw

Kremlin Cup
Kremlin Cup